Ashwood is an unincorporated community and census-designated place (CDP) in Lee County, South Carolina, United States. It was first listed as a CDP prior to the 2020 census which showed a population of 116.

The CDP is bordered to the northeast by Scape Ore Swamp and to the southwest by its tributary McGrits Creek and Ashwood Lake. The community is part of the Black River watershed, flowing to Winyah Bay at Georgetown.

The Ashwood School Gymnasium and Auditorium is a 1930s-era building listed on the National Register of Historic Places.

Demographics

2020 census

Note: the US Census treats Hispanic/Latino as an ethnic category. This table excludes Latinos from the racial categories and assigns them to a separate category. Hispanics/Latinos can be of any race.

References 

Census-designated places in Lee County, South Carolina
Census-designated places in South Carolina